The Faceless Hunters are a race of alien supervillains in the DC Comics universe that first appeared in Strange Adventures #124 (January 1961). They were created by Gardner Fox and Mike Sekowsky. The Faceless Hunters hail from Klaramar (the word Klar-a-mar breaks down into "clear of imperfection":  Klar is the German language term for "clear", and "mar" can mean either blemish or imperfection).

Publication history
The Faceless Hunters made three appearances in DC Comics flagship science fiction anthology title, all written by Gardner Fox - Strange Adventures, in issues #124 (January 1961) with artists Mike Sekowsky and Murphy Anderson, #142 (July 1962) with art by Carmine Infantino and Murphy Anderson, and #153 (June 1963), with art by Gil Kane and Sid Greene. All three stories also featured on the covers of those issues, with art by Murphy Anderson.

Since then they have made few appearances in the DC Universe: as one of 'The Forgotten Villains' in DC Comics Presents #77-78 (January - February 1985), written by Marv Wolfman and drawn by Curt Swan and Dave Hunt, briefly in Resurrection Man #25 (February 1999) and Young Justice #50 (December 2002), in Green Lantern (vol. 5) #12 (July 2006) and #15-16 (December 2006 - January 2007), written by Geoff Johns, and most recently in Superman: World of New Krypton #9 (November 2009).

Fictional character biography

Strange Adventures

The Faceless Hunters first come to public attention in 1961 after one of them, Klee Pan, is intercepted trying to steal major world sculptures such as the Mount Rushmore heads and the Easter Island statues. Oregon Highway Patrolmen Bob Colby and Jim Boone are assigned to Mount Rushmore, and confront Klee Pan, who explains that he comes from Klaramar - a world revolving within an atom on the planet Saturn and he is looking for a stone face left on Earth millennia ago which can help prevent Saturn exploding. He reveals that an evil Faceless Hunter, Chun Yull, has planted an 'ultimate energy time-bomb' and threatened to detonate it unless he is made supreme ruler, but died giving no clues as to where the face, which can defuse the bomb, was hidden. Boone deduces that the face is on The Moon, and Klee Pan takes Colby and Boone there and then to Saturn - after cutting the face from the Moon's surface. When the face is destroyed by a trap set by Chun Yull, the patrolmen help reconstruct it (using an astronomy book Boone happens to have had in the patrol car), disarm the bomb and save the planet. The Faceless Hunters replace the face on the Moon in gratitude, and Klee Pan gives both men telepathic abilities.

Having in fact teleported himself to Saturn instead of dying, Chun Yull later revives and vows revenge on the patrolmen who had thwarted him, and on Earth. He captures Colby and Boone and builds a new bomb, then teleports them all to Klaramar, where Klee Pan once again foils Chun Yull and returns Colby and Boone to Earth. A year later, Chun Yull telepathically commands Colby and Boone to build a machine which increases his size and transports him to Earth again, which he threatens to destroy unless he is made 'Earth Citizen Number One'. After the United Nations comply, he reveals that he lied - Faceless Hunters are unable to destroy a planet unless they are citizens of it. Meanwhile, Colby and Boone manage to beam themselves to Klaramar and Klee Pan saves Earth and again captures Chun Yull.

DC Comics Presents

After this defeat, Chun Yull is imprisoned within inescapable 'Spheres of Light', from which he is almost instantly freed by The Enchantress because she needed his space traveling powers; he then travels the stars for over 20 years looking for a sorcerer she wishes to team up with to rule the Universe. Together with Yggardis the Living Planet, Atom Master, Kraklow the Mystic, Vandal Savage, Mister Poseidon and Ultivac, Chun Yull and The Enchantress form part of a criminal organization known as The Forgotten Villains. Superman joins a disparate group of minor heroes from the 20th century and the future banded together as 'The Forgotten Heroes' and defeats Chun Yull in the future, returning him to captivity. He later briefly reappears during the Crisis on Infinite Earths as a member of Lex Luthor and Brainiac's army of villains.

After the Crisis, nothing is known of Chun Yull or the other Faceless Hunters until he and the Forgotten Villains battle the Forgotten Heroes again; this time 1.93 million years in the past. He is returned to captivity back in the 20th century in Rip Hunter's Time Machine, after being abandoned with the rest of the Forgotten Villains by Kraklow and defeated by Animal Man. Eighteen months later he is fighting Young Justice on the island nation of Zandia.

Revenge of the Green Lanterns

Just over three years later, three Faceless Hunters working as bounty hunters, including Chun Yull, are hunting Green Lanterns. They take control of the minds of a number of the Global Guardians to capture Green Lantern Hal Jordan; but are mistakenly attacked by a team of Rocket Reds assuming Green Lantern is with them - thwarting their plans to wipe his memory.

New Krypton

The Faceless Hunters later appeared in Superman: World of New Krypton #9 (November 2009), under the command of Jemm, Son of Saturn who appears to be the de facto ruler of all three known Saturnian races, including the albino "Koolars", and the yellow skinned "Faceless Hunters".

Powers and abilities
The Klaramarians are normally of sub-atomic size, although they can control this, and are often much taller than humans, with a corresponding increase in strength. They also have access to extremely advanced alien technology. Both Chun Yull and Klee Pan possess great strength and the ability to absorb the material or energetic properties of anything they touch and project those properties explosively. Chun Yull displayed the unique quality of giving himself unaided flight using his abilities while battling Superman.

Most Klaramarians also appear to be telepaths. Klee Pan demonstrated the ability to grant limited telepathy to deserving humans.

Other versions

JLA/Avengers
Faceless Hunter is among the mind-controlled villains defending Krona's stronghold in #4.

In other media
 A Faceless Hunter appears in the Batman: The Brave and the Bold two-part episode "The Siege of Starro!", voiced by John DiMaggio. This version is a violent outcast from a peaceful society. When Starro attacked their planet, only to find that the faceless inhabitants were immune to its parasites, the Faceless Hunter struck a deal with it to destroy his own planet in exchange for becoming its herald. Ever since, he traveled across the universe, preparing planets for Starro's destruction before eventually coming to Earth. While the Faceless Hunter defeats the heroes who Starro could not possess and prepares to drain Earth's energy for Starro, he is foiled by Batman, Booster Gold, Captain Marvel, Firestorm, and B'wana Beast. Undeterred, the Faceless Hunter captures B'wana Beast and uses his powers to combine the Starro parasites into one giant monster capable of destroying planets and draining energy on its own. Batman infiltrates the Faceless Hunter's ship and defeats him while B'wana Beast sacrifices himself to destroy Starro.
 A Faceless Hunter leader named Jemm appears in the Supergirl episode "Human For a Day", portrayed by Charles Halford. This version of the species is from Saturn.

References

External links
 DCU Guide: Faceless Hunter
 'Vanishing Point': Forgotten Villains
  'Vanishing Point': Forgotten Heroes

Characters created by Gardner Fox
Characters created by Mike Sekowsky
Comics characters introduced in 1961
DC Comics alien species
DC Comics characters who are shapeshifters
DC Comics characters with superhuman strength
DC Comics extraterrestrial supervillains
DC Comics supervillains
DC Comics telepaths
Fictional mass murderers
Fictional characters with absorption or parasitic abilities
Fictional characters with energy-manipulation abilities
Fictional characters who can change size